Justice Phillips may refer to:

Hawthorne Phillips, associate justice of the Texas Supreme Court
Jesse J. Phillips, associate justice of the Illinois Supreme Court
Joseph Phillips (judge), associate justice of the Illinois Supreme Court
Nelson Phillips, chief justice of the Texas Supreme Court
Peter Phillips (judge), associate justice of the Rhode Island Supreme Court
Thomas R. Phillips, chief justice of the Texas Supreme Court

See also
Judge Phillips (disambiguation)